Wandering Streams is a 2010 French drama film directed by Pascal Rabaté.

Cast 
 Daniel Prévost as Émile
 Bulle Ogier as Lucie
 Hélène Vincent as Lyse
 Philippe Nahon as Edmond
 Julie-Marie Parmentier as Lena
 Bruno Lochet as Gérard

References

External links 

2010 drama films
2010 films
Films based on French comics
Live-action films based on comics
French drama films
2010s French films